The Windward Islands cricket team is a composite team representing the member associations of the Windward Islands Cricket Board of Control, which itself is a member association of the larger West Indies Cricket Board. The team incorporates players from several small islands in the Lesser Antilles, an island arc in the Caribbean Sea. These countries are Dominica, Grenada, Saint Lucia, and the Saint Vincent and the Grenadines, which, from 1940, made up the British Windward Islands colony (sustained until 1958). Although matches were played in the islands from the late 19th century, a combined team was not formed until the early 1950s, when semi-annual matches against a representative Leeward Islands team commenced. The Windwards played its first match at first-class level in December 1959, against a touring English side.

For the inaugural 1965–66 season of the Shell Shield, the Leewards and Windwards associations together entered a "Combined Islands" team, an arrangement which persisted on and off until the 1981–82 season, when the associations began to consistently enter separate teams. However, the Windwards still played regularly at first-class level during this time, against other West Indian domestic teams and touring international teams. Since its re-entry into the main domestic first-class competition, the team has played every season, although the team has never won the competition. In total, the Leewards have played 229 first-class matches, winning 48, drawing 66, losing 115, and having eight matches abandoned. Of these, 183 matches were played in the main West Indian domestic competition. A total of 185 players have played at least one first-class match for the team since its debut.


Key

List of players
Statistics only include first-class matches played for the Windward Islands, and are correct as of 14 June 2013:

List of captains
Twenty-five players have captained the Windwards in at least one first-class match, with Grenadian Rawl Lewis' 69 matches between 2000 and 2009 the most of any one player. Of the team's captains, seven were Dominican, four Grenadian, three Saint Lucian, eight Vincentian, two Barbadian and one (Wilf Slack) English, although Vincentian by birth.

Notes and references
Notes

References

Windward Islands, first-class
First-class